Haih or Amortecedor is the ninth studio album by the Brazilian rock band Os Mutantes, their first studio album since Tudo Foi Feito Pelo Sol in 1974 and the first one of new material since Mutantes Ao Vivo in 1976.

Following the band's 2006 reunion at London's Barbican Theatre, Mutantes founder Sergio Dias commenced work on Mutantes' first studio album in 35 years. Dias collaborated with Tom Zé and Jorge Ben (who wrote the band's original hit "A Minha Menina").

The word "haih" means "crow" in the Shoshone language. "Amortecedor" means "shock absorber" in Portuguese.

Critical reception

A reviewer identified as Mojo, writing for Lead World Music Review, summarized, "Gloriously nonsensical and beautifully out there, this is a joyful triumph, 4 out of 5".

Track listing
World version
 Hymns of the World P.1 (Intro) (note: this is a recording of Vladimir Putin addressing the Russian Army
 Querida Querida
 Teclar
 2000 e Agarrum
 Baghdad Blues
 O Careca
 O Mensageiro
 Anagrama
 Samba Do Fidel
 Neurociência do Amor
 Nada Mudou
 Gopala Krishna Om
 Hymns Of The World P.2 (Final)
 Amortecedor (iTunes bonus track)
 Call Me (iTunes bonus track)

Brazilian version

 Hymns of the World P.1
 Amortecedor
 Querida Querida
 Teclar
 2000 E Agarrum
 Bagdad Blues
 Zheng He
 Singing The Blues
 O Mensageiro
 O Careca
 Anagrama
 Samba Do Fidel
 Neurociencia Do Amor
 Call Me
 Hymns Of The World P.2

"Nada Mudou" and "Gopala Krishna Om" appear only on the world version.  "Zheng He" and "Singing The Blues" appear only on the Brazilian version, along with two songs that are bonus tracks on the standard edition: "Amortecedor" and "Call Me". The two versions of the album comprise a total of 17 different songs.

Personnel
 Sérgio Dias – guitar, vocals
 Dinho Leme – drums
 Henrique Peters – keyboard
 Vitor Trida – keyboard, guitar, flute, viola caipira, violin
 Vinicius Junqueira – bass guitar
 Simone Soul – percussion
 Fábio Recco – vocals
 Bia Mendes – vocals

References

2009 albums
Os Mutantes albums